Oliver Jonathan Turvey (born 1 April 1987) is a British professional racing driver, who most recently competed in Formula E, and is currently signed to DS Penske as a reserve driver and a sporting advisor. He was a notable kart racer, with two national titles, and was the 2006 McLaren Autosport BRDC Award winner. His career has been supported by the Racing Steps Foundation.

Career history

Karting
Like many aspiring junior racing drivers, Penrith-born Turvey began his karting career at eight years old. After three seasons, he progressed to the British Cadet Championship in 1999, in which he was placed fifth overall, and was selected as a member of the English National team, which won that year's Inter-nation Championship. In 2000, Turvey graduated to the Junior Yamaha National Championship and won the title. After a season in Junior TKM, he moved on to the Junior Rotax class in 2002 and added that title to his collection.

Car racing
Turvey made his formula single seater debut in the 2003 British Formula Renault Winter Series and spent the remainder of the season competing in Zip Formula, in which he was the highest-placed rookie. In 2004, he sidestepped into Formula BMW UK with Team SWR and achieved one race win. At the end of the season, he made a one-off Formula Three debut in the Promotion class of the Asian F3 Championship.

In the following season, Turvey stayed with Team SWR in Formula BMW, making eight appearances (each with two race starts) in the ten-round championship. Budgetary restrictions prevented him from entering more than seven rounds in 2006, but points scores in every race (including five wins) secured second place overall. At the Formula BMW World Final in Valencia, he was the highest-placed British finisher in sixth position. Turvey ended the year by beating five other finalists to win the McLaren Autosport BRDC Young Driver of the Year Award.

Although Turvey was expected to graduate to the British F3 Championship in 2007, he has instead opted for the opportunity of competing in continental Europe. He spent the season dovetailing a dual program in Italian Formula Renault and the Formula Renault Eurocup with the experienced Jenzer Motorsport organisation. In 2008, he was runner-up in the British Formula 3 Championship, behind teammate Jaime Alguersuari.

Turvey competed in the World Series by Renault for 2009, where he was once again paired with Alguersuari at Carlin. He won a single race and finished the championship as top rookie, in fourth position. He competed in the 2009–10 GP2 Asia Series season and took part in the 2010 GP2 Series season for the iSport International team.

On 16 November 2010 he took part in the Formula One young drivers test in Abu Dhabi driving for McLaren. Turvey set the second fastest time, 1.1 seconds slower than the quickest time set by Red Bull's Daniel Ricciardo.

With his Racing Steps Foundation backing having expired at the end of 2010, Turvey was unable to raise a budget for another GP2 season in 2011. However, he was drafted by Carlin—the team now competing in its first year of GP2—to replace Mikhail Aleshin for the third round of the championship in Monaco; Aleshin also struggling to find enough money for a full season. He finished in the points in his comeback race, but was subsequently penalised due to jumping the start. He was replaced for the following round by Álvaro Parente, and finished 25th in the championship. Prior to the start of the 2011 GP2 Series Turvey drove in the 2011 GP2 Asia Series season for Ocean Racing Technology.

Aside from his GP2 drives, Turvey also competed in selected rounds of the 2011 Blancpain Endurance Series season for CRS Racing, competing alongside Andrew Kirkaldy and Alvaro Parente in a McLaren MP4-12C GT3.

Turvey joined Gary Paffett as a test driver for McLaren for the 2012 Formula One season.

In 2013 Turvey stepped up from GTs to Sports Prototypes by signing a deal with Jota Sport to race their LMP2 Zytek Z11SN-Nissan in the 2013 European Le Mans Series season and selected rounds of the FIA World Endurance Championship, including the 2013 24 Hours of Le Mans. Turvey qualified on pole position and won his first start in the car, at the opening rain-shortened ELMS round at Silverstone.

In February 2014 it was announced that Turvey would partner Fabien Giroix and John Martin in an LMP2 Oreca 03-Nissan run by Delta Motorsport and Millennium Racing for an assault on the 2014 FIA World Endurance Championship season. However the team's plans received a setback when they withdrew from the season-opening 6 Hours of Silverstone due to delays in receiving funding. They subsequently missed the second round of the WEC and the 2014 24 Hours of Le Mans due to their financial problems. However Turvey received a call up from the Jota squad to race at Le Mans when Jota and Audi reserve driver Marc Gené replaced Audi driver Loïc Duval when the latter was injured in a practice crash. Turvey subsequently shared the LMP2 class win alongside his teammates.

Formula E

Turvey would make his Formula E debut for NEXTEV TCR at the 2015 London ePrix, partnering with Nelson Piquet Jr.. He would finish ninth in both events. He and Piquet Jr. would be retained for the 2015–16 season, where he would place 14th in the final standings with 11 points alongside a best finish of sixth at Beijing. Turvey, now with a rebranded NEXTEV NIO for the 2016–17 season, would earn his first pole position in Formula E at Mexico City after Daniel Abt was penalised due to a tyre pressure infringment, but would ultimately retire from the race due to battery issues. He would finish 12th in the final points standings with 26 points. For the 2017–18 season, Turvey would partner with Luca Filippi in the once again rebranded NIO Formula E Team, where would earn his first podium in Mexico City with a second place finish. He would finish tenth in the standings with 46 points despite withdrawing from the New York ePrix due to suffering a hand injury during second practice. Turvey would then partner with Tom Dillmann for the 2018–19 season, where he would only score seven points throughout the course of the season with a best result of eighth at Santiago. In the following season, he would partner with Ma Qinghua at the beginning of the year and then with Daniel Abt for the final rounds at Berlin for NIO 333 FE Team, where he would 24th in the standings with no points. He would then partner with Tom Blomqvist for the 2020–21 season, finishing 23rd in the standings with 13 points and a best result of sixth at Diriyah. Turvey would partner with former Formula 2 driver Dan Ticktum for the 2021–22 season, where he would only finish in the points once at Rome with a seventh place finish. He would finish 18th in the standings. Turvey would not be retained for the following season, and would join DS Penske as the team's reserve driver as well as sporting advisor.

Awards
Dec. 2006 – McLaren Autosport BRDC Award
2008  – Sports Personality of the Year award at the 2008 Cumbria Sports Awards
2008 – Daily Mirror Best British Driver in F3 Award
2008 – Awarded the Dunhill Future Champion Award at Goodwood Festival of Speed
2008 – University of Cambridge Extraordinary Full Blue for Motorsport (the first ever for the sport).
2008 – British Racing Drivers' Club National Racing Driver of the Year

Education
Turvey attended Queen Elizabeth Grammar School in Penrith, Cumbria in England and Fitzwilliam College, Cambridge as an undergraduate, where he studied engineering. In late 2007, he applied to become a Cambridge Full Blue, the highest honour that can be awarded to a sportsman at the university. He completed his bachelor's degree in 2008 and was awarded the Full Blue by the university; the first ever racing driver to be awarded the accolade. His Master's will include a dissertation on F1 aerodynamics. He has a sister, called Lucie, who also attended Queen Elizabeth Grammar School. Oliver currently lives in London.

Racing career

Career summary

† As Turvey was a guest driver, he was ineligible for points.
* Season still in progress.

Complete Formula Renault 3.5 Series results
(key) (Races in bold indicate pole position) (Races in italics indicate fastest lap)

Complete GP2 Series results
(key) (Races in bold indicate pole position) (Races in italics indicate fastest lap)

Complete GP2 Asia Series results
(key) (Races in bold indicate pole position) (Races in italics indicate fastest lap)

24 Hours of Le Mans results

Complete European Le Mans Series results
(key) (Races in bold indicate pole position) (Races in italics indicate fastest lap)

Complete Super GT results
(key) (Races in bold indicate pole position) (Races in italics indicate fastest lap)

Complete Formula E results
(key) (Races in bold indicate pole position; races in italics indicate fastest lap)

† Driver did not finish the race, but was classified as he completed more than 90% of the race distance.
* Season still in progress.

Complete FIA World Endurance Championship results
(key) (Races in bold indicate pole position; races in italics indicate fastest lap)

References

External links
 
 

1987 births
Living people
English racing drivers
People from Penrith, Cumbria
Alumni of Fitzwilliam College, Cambridge
Formula Renault Eurocup drivers
Italian Formula Renault 2.0 drivers
British Formula Renault 2.0 drivers
Formula BMW UK drivers
GP2 Asia Series drivers
GP2 Series drivers
World Series Formula V8 3.5 drivers
European Le Mans Series drivers
Blancpain Endurance Series drivers
24 Hours of Le Mans drivers
FIA World Endurance Championship drivers
24 Hours of Spa drivers
Super GT drivers
Formula E drivers
Porsche Carrera Cup GB drivers
Mark Burdett Motorsport drivers
Jenzer Motorsport drivers
Carlin racing drivers
iSport International drivers
Jota Sport drivers
NIO 333 FE Team drivers
Sportspeople from Cumbria
British Formula Three Championship drivers
Campos Racing drivers
CRS Racing drivers
Ocean Racing Technology drivers
Manor Motorsport drivers